Browning Apartments is a historic three-story building in Ogden, Utah. It was built in 1916 for investor George Emmett Browning, who served as the mayor of Ogden from 1925 to 1927. A member of the Church of Jesus Christ of Latter-day Saints, he was also the president of its Weber stake for sixteen years. The building was designed in the Prairie School style, and Browning resided in apartment 3 from 1930 to 1948. It has been listed on the National Register of Historic Places since December 19, 1985.

References

Buildings and structures in Ogden, Utah
National Register of Historic Places in Weber County, Utah
Prairie School architecture in Utah
Residential buildings completed in 1916
1916 establishments in Utah